Yekhe-Tsagan (Yekhe Sagaan) is a rural locality (an ulus) in Selenginsky District, Republic of Buryatia, Russia. The population was 399 as of 2010. There are 6 streets.

Geography 
Yekhe-Tsagan is located 41 km southwest of Gusinoozyorsk (the district's administrative centre) by road. 5818-y km is the nearest rural locality.

References 

Rural localities in Selenginsky District